The following is a list of episodes for the Adult Swim television series,  Delocated, along with descriptions for each episode. The episodes are ordered chronologically by airdate for each season. Like many shows on Adult Swim, the series originally had an 11 minute runtime; however, in 2010, the runtime was expanded to 22 minutes for the 2nd season onward. , 30 episodes of Delocated, including the pilot and series finale, have aired.

The first two seasons were released on DVD in the United States on January 17, 2012.

Series overview

Episodes

Season 1 (2008–09)

Season 2 (2010)
This season, the runtime of each episode was expanded to 22 minutes (to fit a half-hour TV timeslot) -- twice the length of season one's episodes. The second season began airing August 22, 2010.

Season 3 (2012)

Series finale (2013)

References

External links
 
 

PFFR
Lists of American comedy television series episodes